Malice is a 1993 American neo-noir thriller film directed by Harold Becker, written by Aaron Sorkin and Scott Frank, and starring Alec Baldwin, Nicole Kidman, Bill Pullman, Anne Bancroft and George C. Scott. Adapted from a story by Jonas McCord, the plot follows Andy and Tracy Safian, a newlywed couple whose lives are upturned after they rent part of their Victorian home to Jed, a cavalier surgeon; things are further complicated when he removes Tracy's ovaries during an emergency surgery to save her life. The film features supporting performances from Bebe Neuwirth, Peter Gallagher, and Tobin Bell, with minor appearances from Gwyneth Paltrow and Brenda Strong.

Released in the fall of 1993, Malice grossed a total of $61 million worldwide and received mixed reviews from critics.

Plot
Andy and Tracy Safian are a newlywed couple living in a Victorian house that they are restoring in Western Massachusetts. He is an Associate Dean at a local women's college, while his wife teaches art to children. They hope to start a family soon. One night before making love, they notice the young boy next door at his window, seemingly watching them. They jokingly refer to him as a voyeur.

When a student on campus is attacked and seriously wounded by a serial rapist, Dr. Jed Hill, a brilliant surgeon who has recently joined the staff of the area hospital, operates and saves her life. Andy meets Jed to thank him for saving the student and realizes that they attended high school together. Andy and Jed quickly strike up a friendship. Money is tight, so Andy invites him to rent the third floor of their home, in order to finance the new plumbing. Tracy is unhappy that Andy has invited Jed to live with them. She describes Jed as arrogant. Jed brings home a woman and causes noise disturbance late at night, to Tracy’s annoyance.

Andy finds the body of one his students, who has been raped and murdered by the serial rapist. Police detective Dana Harris interviews him as a possible suspect and asks him to provide a semen sample. While leaving the police station, Andy learns that Tracy has been hospitalized for severe pain in her abdomen and is being operated on by Jed. While removing one of Tracy's ovaries, which has ruptured due to a cyst, Jed discovers Tracy is pregnant, but the surgery causes the fetus to abort. Another doctor notices that Tracy's other ovary is torsed and appears necrotic. Jed consults with Andy and advises him to agree to the removal of Tracy's second ovary, rather than risk her life. Andy painfully agrees, since this will mean that Tracy can never have children. Jed removes it, overruling the protests of other doctors that the ovary might still be healthy. After the removal, it is confirmed that the ovary was, in fact, healthy. Tracy tells Jed she's suing him for malpractice.

During a deposition in which Jed is accused of having a God complex, Jed delivers a monologue proudly claiming himself infallible as a surgeon, asserting "I am God," due to his ability to heal patients, then storms out. With Hill absent, Tracy's lawyer reveals that Jed had been in a bar the night of the operation.  "Ask God how many shots of bourbon he had before he cut me open," Tracy tells the hospital's attorneys.  Fearful of the negative publicity that would result from a civil trial, the hospital and Jed's insurance company settle with Andy and Tracy for $20 million. However, Tracy leaves Andy, telling him that she can't forgive him for the loss of her ability to have children.

Andy discovers that the serial rapist is a handyman at the college named Earl. After a struggle, Andy subdues him and Earl is arrested, thus clearing Andy of the crimes. In the aftermath, Dana informs Andy that his semen sample indicated that he was sterile, thereby revealing he wasn't the father of the aborted child. Andy confronts Tracy's lawyer, Dennis Riley, accusing him of having impregnated Tracy. Riley calmly asserts his innocence, but tells Andy that Tracy's mother — who she had told Andy had died 12 years ago — can answer all of his questions. Riley refuses to break lawyer-client privilege, but tells Andy to take a bottle of Scotch to her.

Andy tracks down Mrs. Kennsinger, who tells Andy that Tracy is a lifelong con artist. As a younger woman, she had an affair with a wealthy man, who paid for her to have an abortion; Tracy kept the money and had it done at a clinic, beginning her career as a con woman. Andy subsequently learns that Tracy and Jed had been carrying on an affair for some time. Tracy had arranged for Jed to move into the house so that he could begin overdosing her with a drug to intentionally cause the ovarian cyst. Andy confronts Tracy and tells her he wants half of the settlement money. Suspecting that she might try to murder him, Andy implies their next-door neighbor, the ten-year-old boy who's been their seeming voyeur, is named in his will as a potential police witness to her and Jed's nefarious activities.

Jed tells Tracy to give Andy what he wants so they can leave the country, but Tracy instead suggests murdering the boy. Jed refuses to kill a child, so Tracy shoots Jed dead. She then slips into the neighbor's house and attempts to suffocate the boy in his chair, only to find a dummy in his place. An enraged Tracy begins to destroy the dummy and attacks Andy after he walks in on her. They fall from the second floor, but they both survive. Detective Harris appears and arrests her, revealing that the boy's supposed agreement to testify against her was part of a sting operation to catch her in the act of attempted murder.

As Tracy is led away in handcuffs, the boy and his mother return home. As Tracy is taken to the police cruiser, Tracy sees that the boy is, in fact, blind. Andy leaves with Dana to have a drink of Scotch.

Cast

Production
Malice was shot on location in Boston, Amherst, Holyoke, and Northampton in Massachusetts. Smith College was the setting used for Andy's college.

Michael Hirsh and Patrick Loubert, two of the co-founders of Canadian animation studio Nelvana, worked as executive producers on the film.

Aaron Sorkin expressed his disappointment with the film in 2017, saying, "Early on in my career, I wrote a movie that I’m not very proud of at all, it just turned into a mess." He recounted how Becker asked Sorkin to write a "steamy" sex scene between Baldwin and Kidman's character, which he refused: “I said, ‘Are you out of your mind?’ First of all, I just did a movie with her husband [Tom Cruise]. And second of all, no, I'm not going to write down what I'd like to see Nicole do and then hand the pages out to the crew and Nicole.” The scene was eventually created and filmed without the help of Sorkin.

Release
Malice had its world premiere in Los Angeles on September 29, 1993, and opened on 1,431 screens in the U.S. on October 1, 1993 and grossed $9,232,650 during its opening weekend, ranking number 1 at the US box office. It eventually grossed a total of $46,405,336 in the U.S. and Canada and $15.2 million internationally for a worldwide total of $61.6 million,

Critical reception
On Rotten Tomatoes the film has a 57% approval rating based on 30 reviews. On Metacritic it has a score of 52% based on reviews from 17 critics, indicating "mixed or average reviews". Audiences polled by CinemaScore gave the film an average grade of "B+" on an A+ to F scale.

Roger Ebert of the Chicago Sun-Times called the film "one of the busiest movies I've ever seen, a film jampacked with characters and incidents and blind alleys and red herrings. Offhand, this is the only movie I can recall in which an entire subplot about a serial killer is thrown in simply for atmosphere." He added, "I can't go into detail without revealing vital secrets. Yet after the movie is over and you try to think through those secrets, you get into really deep molasses . . . Malice was directed by Harold Becker, whose credits include the splendid films The Onion Field and Sea of Love, and he milks this material for a great deal more than it is worth."

Peter Travers of Rolling Stone observed, "Goaded on by writer Aaron Sorkin, who could run a red-herring factory, the actors work to keep you guessing long after you've caught on. No one shows any shame about going over the top, especially Anne Bancroft in an Oscar-begging cameo as Tracy's mother. Perhaps director Harold Becker thought flashy acting could distract us from the gaping plot holes. It's got suspense but no staying power." Vincent Canby of The New York Times wrote: "No matter how wild the plot reversals, there's always a slightly madder one to come."

Timothy M. Gray of Variety said, "The immaculately crafted Malice is a virtual scrapbook of elements borrowed from other suspense pix, but no less enjoyable for being so familiar. [It] should tickle audiences who want to be entertained without being challenged . . . Some of the plotting gets plodding . . . but on the whole, the script does what it set out to do, and if the filmmakers didn't worry about these things, neither should you . . . After listless performances in such pics as Days of Thunder and Far and Away, Aussie Kidman, who here uses a flawless American accent, proves her strengths as an actress, and Baldwin mixes menace, sex and humor in another terrific performance."

Cultural impact and references
In the 30 Rock episode "St. Valentine's Day", Jack Donaghy, portrayed by Baldwin, confesses to a priest that he once said "I am God" during a deposition. This is a reference to a famous line by Jed Hill, Baldwin's character in this film.

In the episode "Terms of Endearment" of the animated television series Drawn Together, the character Wooldoor Sockbat recites the closing lines of Baldwin's speech verbatim.

See also
 List of films featuring home invasions

References

Works cited

External links

 
 

1993 films
1993 drama films
1993 thriller films
1990s psychological thriller films
1990s thriller drama films
American neo-noir films
American psychological thriller films
American serial killer films
American thriller drama films
Canadian psychological thriller films
Canadian serial killer films
Canadian thriller drama films
Castle Rock Entertainment films
Columbia Pictures films
1990s English-language films
Films about con artists
Films about dysfunctional families
Films directed by Harold Becker
Films scored by Jerry Goldsmith
Films set in Massachusetts
Films with screenplays by Aaron Sorkin
Films with screenplays by Scott Frank
Home invasions in film
Nelvana films
New Line Cinema films
PolyGram Filmed Entertainment films
1990s American films
1990s Canadian films